Suo is a peer-reviewed open access scholarly journal publishing research articles on all aspects of mire and peat research, conservation and utilisation. It is a journal published by Suoseura — the Finnish Peatland Society. The current editor-in-chief is Sakari Sarkkola.

Abstracting and indexing 
The journal is abstracted and indexed in:

References

External links 
 

Open access journals
Publications established in 1950
Soil science journals